Films produced in Israel and the British Mandate for Palestine before 1960:

Overview

Prior to the establishment of the state
Film Industry in Palestine during the British Mandate of Palestine and afterwards during the first years of the state, didn't actually exist. Movies were filmed in Palestine since the time of the beginning of the silent film era during the 19th century, but an actual movie industry was not really conceived, both in the period of the Yishuv, and also during the first years of the state. The films which were produced were rare, and usually didn't match the quality of the films which were imported from abroad. Initially the industry, focused particularly on producing propaganda films and news broadcasts which were shown in the Israeli cinemas during that time before the movies were shown.

The 1950s
During the 1950s, some development was made. Israeli cinema studios were established such as Geva Films" (סרטי גבע) and the "Israel Film Studios" (אולפני ההסרטה בישראל) in Herzliya, and several films which contained plot were created. In 1954, the law to encourage the production of Israeli film (החוק לעידוד הסרט הישראלי) was passed, and in 1955, the most important Israeli film which was filmed until then was produced - Hill 24 Doesn't Answer (גבעה 24 אינה עונה). In the late 1950s, the Israeli film industry was still in its early stages and hadn't managed to create for itself unique characteristics, its own language, or even a real industry. The films were mostly patriotic in nature. The films were not simply "action" or "crime" films, they could belong to these genres but tended to include a very Israeli perspective and touch due to very recent events in the nation's tenuous formation.

Israeli films prior to 1960

After the establishment of the State of Israel

1948

1949

1950

1951

1955

1956

1959

Pre-State of Israel

External links
 Israeli film at the Internet Movie Database
 Oded Hanoded first Israeli Cinema drama film]
 Va'Yehi Be'May first Israeli cinema comedy film]
 Haim Halachmi first Israeli film director]

Israeli
Films
Israeli
Films
Israeli
Films
Israeli
Films
Israeli
Films
Films